Antonín Popp (30 July 1850, Prague - 10 June 1915, Prague) was a Czech sculptor, medallist and teacher.

Life and work 
He was the second of five sons born to the sculptor and porcelain modeller, originally from Coburg, and his Czech wife Aloisie, née Bartoníčková. His older brother, Karel, became a photographer. His works are sometimes confused with his father's, as they worked together on several projects, and both signed their names as "AP" (Ernst is "Arnošt" in Czech).

In 1870, he began to study drawing at the Prague Academy of Fine Arts, but never completed the full course. Later, he made study trips to Munich and Vienna.

Upon returning to Prague, in 1873, he opened his own studio. He also created busts for the hallway of the National Theatre and the Pantheon of the National Museum.
Outside of Prague, his works may be seen in Domažlice, Pardubice and Kladno.

In addition to his sculpting, he taught modelling at Prague Polytechnic (now the Czech Technical University in Prague), where he became an Associate Professor in 1896. He also taught at the Academy of Arts, Architecture and Design (UMPRUM).

He is interred at Vinohrady Cemetery. A collection of his plaster models is stored at the National Museum.

References

Further reading 
 Nový slovník českého výtvarného umění, Vol.2, N–Ž, Anděla Horová (Ed.), Praha Academia 1999, pp.633–634

External links 

 Works by and about Popp @ the National Library of the Czech Republic
 Biographical notes @ AbART
 Biographical notes @ Centrum pro Dějinysochařství

1850 births
1915 deaths
Czech sculptors
20th-century medallists
Czech medallists
Busts (sculpture)
Artists from Prague
Academic staff of the Academy of Arts, Architecture and Design in Prague